Margaret Forbes (c.1807–13 January 1877) was a New Zealand innkeeper and land protester. She was born in Fraserburgh, Aberdeenshire, Scotland on c.1807.

References

1807 births
1877 deaths
New Zealand activists
New Zealand women activists
19th-century New Zealand people